"Ooh, Whatcha Gonna Do" is the second single released from Run–D.M.C.'s sixth studio album, Down with the King. It was produced by legendary production team, The Bomb Squad. In the United States, the song peaked at number 78 on the Billboard Hot R&B/Hip-Hop Songs chart and number 21 on the Hot Rap Singles chart.

Track listing

A-side
"Ooh, Whatcha Gonna Do" – 3:06

B-side
"Ooh, Whatcha Gonna Do" (instrumental) – 4:43 
"Ooh, Whatcha Gonna Do" (radio version) – 3:06

1993 songs
1993 singles
Run-DMC songs
Songs written by Joseph Simmons
Songs written by Darryl McDaniels
Song recordings produced by the Bomb Squad
Profile Records singles